This is a list of schools recognised by Kerala government in Pathanamthitta district of Kerala, India. The list is not at all complete.

Schools affiliated to the Kerala Board of Public Examinations

Pathanamthitta Educational District

Government Schools

Private aided schools

Schools Affiliated to International General Certificate of Secondary Education (IGCSE)

Schools affiliated to the Central Board of Secondary Education (CBSE)

Schools affiliated to the Indian Certificate of Secondary Education (ICSE)

References

Schools in Pathanamthitta district
Pathanamthitta